The al-Aqsa Library, also known as the al-Aqsa Mosque Library, is the assemblage of books in the al-Aqsa Compound.

Locations 

The library has two components:
 The main library: west of al-Aqsa Mosque (al-Qibli).
 The al-Khutniyya Library: south of al-Aqsa Mosque.

Both locations are only accessible from within the compound.

Main library 

The main al-Aqsa library is a general library. 
It is in a building immediately west of al-Aqsa Mosque (al-Qibli Mosque), inside the compound's south wall. This structure went by many names:
 the "White Mosque" and  because of its stones' color.
 the "Women’s Mosque",  ( "women's musalla") and "women's hall" because of its former use by women.
 the "Templars' Armory", because of its use before  as a hall or monastic quarters or refectory or armory by the Templars, who might have it constructed in the 1160s. After 1193 (during the Ayyubid dynasty), a mihrab was installed in the south wall.
 the "mosque of Abu Bekr": possibly a misnomer by 19th-century Europeans.

Its entrance faces the courtyard with the Dome of Yusuf Agha. To its west is the southern section of the Islamic Museum and the al-Fakhariyya Minaret.

In 1923, books dispersed throughout the compound were gathered in the an-Naḥawiyya Dome. 
After inactivity from 1948 to 1976, the library was revived in 1977; books were moved from the Islamic Museum to the Ashrafiyya Madrasa, and then in 2000 to the Women’s Mosque.

Al-Khutniyya Library 

The al-Khutniyya Library (also al-Khutaniyya and al-Khataniyya) is a manuscript library. It shares its name with a former zawiya and madrasa, which was named after a scholar, Sheikh al-Khutnī/al-Khatanī. 

It is inside Old al-Aqsa and on top of the now-sealed Double Gate.
Its access is via a tunnel under the al-Aqsa Mosque (al-Qibli Mosque). The tunnel's only entryway/exit is before the mosque's portico, facing north.

This library began in 1998 as the initiative of a mosque volunteer, Marwan Nashashibi (1934-2014), and his wife, Um Adnan. 
Its collection has texts on jurisprudence, hadiths, hagiography, Sufism and other topics.

Services 

Its director (chief librarian) is often also the director (head curator) of the Islamic Museum.

It has about 20,000 books, notably on Islamic archaeology. Books are mostly in Arabic and English, with some in French.
It has about 2,000 titles of Arabic manuscripts, from the 5th century to the Ottoman period. Only researchers have access to the manuscripts.
It also has a large number of Palestinian newspapers and magazines, many dating to the early 20th century.

It has a department dedicated to children and youths in the main library.

See also

 Ashrafiyya Madrasa (the al-Aqsa Center for the Restoration of Islamic Manuscripts)
 Other Palestinian libraries in the area:
 Issaf Nashashibi Center for Culture and Literature
 Khalidi Library
 Al-Budeiri Library

References

External links
 
  
  (about 5 minutes): The clips switch back and forth between the two libraries and some interviews 
 Library's collection of manuscripts: 12th–19th century

Libraries in Jerusalem
Archives in the State of Palestine
Palestinian culture